Saw Soe was a principal queen consort of King Kyawswa of the Pagan Dynasty of Burma (Myanmar). The royal chronicles identify her as the chief queen of Kyawswa but historians identify Saw Thitmahti as the chief queen.

The queen was the mother of Viceroy of Pagan Saw Hnit, Governor of Thayet Min Shin Saw, Queen Saw Min Ya of Pinya, Queen Saw Hnaung of Sagaing and Queen Mway Medaw of Pinya. She was also the paternal grandmother of King Swa Saw Ke of Ava.

Ancestry
The following is her ancestry as reported by the Hmannan Yazawin chronicle. She was a descendant of Gen. Nyaung-U Hpi from her father's side and a granddaughter of King Kyaswa from her mother's side.

References

Bibliography
 
 

Queens consort of Pagan
13th-century Burmese women
14th-century Burmese women